The Self-portrait is an oil on canvas painting by the Flemish artist Anthony van Dyck. It is held at the Metropolitan Museum of Art, in New York. The work depicts its creator during his early twenties.

Description
The self-portrait was probably painted by van Dyck during the winter of 1620–1621, which the artist spent in London. Van Dyck chose to portray himself as a country gentlemen dressed in fine clothes; he likely acquired these clothes due to his father being a wealthy clothier. 

The painting was donated to the Metropolitan Museum by the American banker Jules Bache in 1949.

References

1620 paintings
Portraits by Anthony van Dyck
Paintings in the collection of the Metropolitan Museum of Art